Arianna Fernanda Follis (born 11 November 1977, in Ivrea, Piedmont) is an Italian cross-country skier who started competing in 1995. Competing in two Winter Olympics, she earned a bronze medal in the 4 × 5 km relay at Turin in 2006.

Follis earned five medals at the FIS Nordic World Ski Championships with a gold (Individual sprint: 2009), one silver (Individual sprint: 2011) and three bronzes (10 km: 2007, Team sprint: 2009, 4 × 5 km relay: 2005). She has six individual victories at various levels up to 10 km since 1998.

She retired from cross-country skiing after the 2010–2011 season.

Cross-country skiing results
All results are sourced from the International Ski Federation (FIS).

Olympic Games
 1 medal – (1 bronze)

World Championships
 5 medals – (1 gold, 1 silver, 3 bronze)

a.  Cancelled due to extremely cold weather.

World Cup

Season standings

Individual podiums
 8 victories – (3 , 5 ) 
 23 podiums – (13 , 10 )

Team podiums
 4 victories – (1 , 3 ) 
 13 podiums – (7 , 6 )

Italian Championships
 2001: 2nd, Italian women's championships of cross-country skiing, sprint
 2003: 3rd, Italian women's championships of cross-country skiing, 10 km pursuit
 2004: 2nd, Italian women's championships of cross-country skiing, sprint
 2005: 3rd, Italian women's championships of cross-country skiing, 2 × 7.5 km pursuit
 2006: 3rd, Italian women's championships of cross-country skiing, sprint
 2007: 3rd, Italian women's championships of cross-country skiing, 2 × 7.5 km pursuit
 2008: 1st, Italian women's championships of cross-country skiing, 30 km
 2009: 1st, Italian women's championships of cross-country skiing, 30 km
 2010:
 1st, Italian women's championships of cross-country skiing, 30 km
 1st, Italian women's championships of cross-country skiing, 2 × 7.5 km pursuit
 2011: 2nd, Italian women's championships of cross-country skiing, 10 km

Ski mountaineering results 
 2000: 1st, Tour du Rutor (together with Gloriana Pellissier)
 2001: 1st, Trofeo Mezzalama (together with Gloriana Pellissier and Alexia Zuberer)
 2003: 1st, Trofeo Mezzalama (together with Cristina Favre-Moretti and Chiara Raso)

References

External links 

 
 
 
 

1977 births
Living people
Italian female cross-country skiers
Italian female ski mountaineers
Olympic cross-country skiers of Italy
Olympic bronze medalists for Italy
Olympic medalists in cross-country skiing
Cross-country skiers at the 2006 Winter Olympics
Cross-country skiers at the 2010 Winter Olympics
Medalists at the 2006 Winter Olympics
FIS Nordic World Ski Championships medalists in cross-country skiing
Tour de Ski skiers
People from Ivrea
Sportspeople from the Metropolitan City of Turin